Henry N. Ginsberg is an American physician, focusing in preventive medicine, internal medicine, endocrinology, diabetes and metabolism, currently the Irving Professor of Medicine at Columbia University.

Education
Ginsberg graduated from State University of New York Downstate Medical Center.

References

Year of birth missing (living people)
Living people
Columbia University faculty
American endocrinologists
Brooklyn College alumni
SUNY Downstate Medical Center alumni